Jan Jenny-Starý (1884–1959) was a Czech footballer.

Early life 
At the age of 11, Jan played youth football for a team in Žitná. Jan later founded a youth football team from Vinohrady Grammar School in Kanálka.

Club career 
Jan played his first game in the red and white colours of Slavia Prague, in 1901, in a 8-0 victory over the French side RC Paris. In that same season, Jan was moved down to their reserve team. Eventually, he was moved back up to the first team, to play regular football. In 1906, Jan played in an 11-0 victory against Terézvárosi TC and scored 4 goals. By 1907 Jan had scored 200 goals.

Style of play 
Jan was a great technician. Jake Madden once said that, “He could balance the whole forward line with his insight, sophistication, technical and tactical art.”

Honours 
Charity Cup: 1910,1911,1912

Silver Cup: 1911

European Amateur Championship: 1911

References 

Footballers from the Austro-Hungarian Empire

1884 births
1959 deaths
Association football forwards
SK Slavia Prague players